The Carlos Palanca Memorial Awards for Literature winners in the year 1982 (rank, title of winning entry, name of author).

English division
Novel
Grand prize: "Surveyors of the Liguasan Marsh" by Antonio R. Enriquez

Short story
First prize: "Heartland" by Jose Y. Dalisay, Jr.
Second prize: "Pas De Deux" by Azucena Grajo Uranza
Third prize: "The Sky is Always Blue" by Jose Marte Abueg

Poetry
First prize: Monologues or Otherwise I & II by Pablo Liwanag; and Outsider and Other Poems by Cesar Felipe Bacani, Jr.
Second prize: Masbate by Simeon Dumdum, Jr.; and Tightwire and Other Poems by Alfred A. Yuson
Third prize: Dolphin, Dinosaurs and Eagles by Augusta Almedda; and Pax Panda and Other Poems by Edgardo B. Maranan

Essay
First prize: "Archipelagos of Time: Islands of the Universe" by Jesus S.M. Dimapilis
Second prize: "A Gift From the Island" by Jorshinelle Sonza
Third prize: "Bound to the Earth" by Sheila Coronel

One-Act Play
First prize: No winner
Second prize: No winner
Third prize: The Wayside Café by Tony Perez
Special mention Late Journey Home by Elsa M. Coscolluela

Full-length play
First prize: No winner
Second prize: No winner
Third prize: No winner
Special mention Return to Villa Fuente by Leopoldo C. Gonzales; and The Gemini Conspiracy by Elsa M. Coscolluela

Filipino division
Novel
Grand prize: Kulang ng Isa sa Sandosena: Ba't di pa Magkasya sa Labing-isa na Lang by Victor V. Francisco; and Tutubi! Tutubi! 'Wag Kang Magpapahuli sa Mamang Salbahe by Jun Cruz Reyes

Short story
First prize: "Tatlong Kuwento ng Buhay ni Julian Candelabra" by Lualhati Bautista
Second prize: "Arrivederci" by Fanny A. Garcia
Third prize: Awan nangabak
Special mention "Biyernes Santo: Mainit na Araw, Malamig na Sago" by Ma. Cristina Mata-Basco; and "Paglaya" by Cresenciano Marquez, Jr.

Poetry
First prize: Odyssey ng Siglo by Cresenciano Marquez, Jr.
Second prize: Tula ng Aking Panahon by Mar Al. Tiburcio
Third prize: Balada sa Baklad, sa Darating na Liwanag by Edgardo B. Maranan

Essay
First prize: "Isang Liham sa Baul ng Isang Manunulat" by Fanny A. Garcia
Second prize: "Italia! Italia!" by Fanny A. Garcia
Third prize: "Proyekto sa Ilog Chico: Isang Dambuhalang Talinhaga sa Panahon Natin" by Anselmo Roque

One-act play
First prize: Taong-Grasa by Anton Juan, Jr.
Second prize: Nana by Rene O. Villanueva
Third prize: Si Mr. Daga, Si Mrs. Daga at ang Doktor by Leoncio P. Deriada

Full-length play
First prize: 'Awan nangabak
Second prize: Ang Mahabang Pagdadalawang-isip sa Maikling Buhay ng Isang Petiburgis by Malou Leviste Jacob
Third prize: Lamat by Jose Javier Reyes

References
 

Palanca Awards
Palanca Awards, 1982